Pontnewynydd is a predominantly working class suburb of Pontypool, Torfaen, in Wales. It should not be confused with Pontnewydd in nearby Cwmbran.

Location 

It lies in between Pontypool to the south and Snatchwood to the north. The area of Torfaen is historically industrial and the Pontnewynydd Iron Works once employed many people in the area. This works became known as the Partridge Jones and John Paton (PJ & JP) Iron Works. During the Second World War the works produced much of the corrugated iron for the Anderson shelters that were constructed throughout the country as makeshift air raid shelters. It finally closed in 1961, along with a number of other local works when the Llanwern Steelworks opened in Newport.

The Monmouthshire Canal which ran from Newport to Pontnewynydd was authorised by an Act of Parliament on 3 June 1792. The section of canal from Pontymoile to Pontnewynydd was drained in the 1850s and the canal bed used to lay a railway line, which was eventually extended to Blaenavon.

Amenities 
There is a small selection of shops and a car repairs garage. In 2001 the population was 1527 (49.5% Male, 50.5% Female) with an electorate of 1,174.

The main social club built for the workers at the PJ & JP works was located adjacent to the works on Hanbury Road and continued long after the works closed. An example of its prominence in the area is that the club was the official host to the visiting South African Springboks rugby touring team during 1961 when they played at Pontypool. The club hosted regular live entertainment and boxing bouts.

The local Pontnewynydd Sports & Social Club has recently ended a very long association with The Royal British Legion. Membership applications have soared since this happened and it is looking forward to being the premier entertainments centre in the village. Trevethin AFC who play their football in the village, and who head their division, use the Club as its base.

There are regular buses south to Pontypool, Cwmbran and Newport and north to Abersychan, Varteg Hill and Blaenavon. However, there is no longer a train service - the local station (on the Newport - Blaenavon line) having closed in April 1962, which was more than a year before the "Beeching Axe".  In financial terms the line was doing no worse than any of the other lines in the South Wales valleys but, like the local ironworks, the closure of the railway line was also linked to the opening of Llanwern steelworks. The amount of freight traffic the new plant generated was causing severe rail congestion in the Newport area and in an era when passenger rail transport was in decline a number of local services in Monmouthshire were withdrawn by the British Transport Commission as an operational measure.

Education
Education in the village was provided by Pontnewynydd Primary School. The school, located in a building constructed in 1901, opened in 1903. It closed in July 2015

Notable residents 
Sir John Ballinger, CBE, the first librarian at the National Library of Wales was born here in 1860. His father was employed at the Iron Works.
The poet Myfanwy Haycock was born in the village in 1913. 
Dame Gwyneth Jones was born locally in 1936.
The author David Llewellyn grew up in the village.

References

External links
Pontypool Past & Present - Pontypool's only community website!
www.geograph.co.uk : photos of Pontnewynydd and surrounding area

Villages in Torfaen
Electoral wards of Torfaen